Alfred Bernard Vandeweghe (October 25, 1920 – February 2, 2014) was a professional American football player for the All-America Football Conference's Buffalo Bisons. He played in five games in the 1946 season after his collegiate career at William & Mary. He later coached at his alma mater from 1947 through 1949.

Early life, education and military service
He played at Ridgefield Memorial High School in New Jersey. He transferred to Hampton High School in Virginia, where he played basketball and football. He graduated from the College of William & Mary in 1943, were he played football and was co-captain of the basketball team.

He served in the United States Navy at the United States Naval Training Center Bainbridge, where he played football for the Bainbridge Commodores and earned Mid-Atlantic All-Service honors. He also played football on the Fleet City Blue Jackets at Camp Shoemaker, California, where the team went 8–0–1 in 1945.

References

1920 births
2014 deaths
American men's basketball players
Bainbridge Commodores football players
Buffalo Bisons (AAFC) players
Sportspeople from Hampton, Virginia
People from Wyckoff, New Jersey
Players of American football from New Jersey
Players of American football from Virginia
William & Mary Tribe football coaches
William & Mary Tribe football players
William & Mary Tribe men's basketball players
People from Midlothian, Virginia
Ridgefield Memorial High School alumni
Hampton High School (Virginia) alumni
United States Navy sailors